FIAA may refer to:

 Federation of Indian Automobile Associations
 Fellow of the Institute of Actuaries of Australia
 Fellow of the Israel Association of Actuaries
 Florida Interscholastic Athletic Association
 Front Islamique Arabe de l'Azawad
 Furnishing Industry Association of Australia
 Future Instructors of America Association
 First In Adoption Act
Fiaa may refer to :
 an alternative spelling for Fih, Lebanon